Elisabeth Mannering Congdon (April 22, 1894 – June 27, 1977) was a wealthy resident of Duluth, Minnesota, USA who became famous after she and her nurse were found murdered on June 27, 1977.

Biography
Elisabeth Congdon was born to mining magnate Chester Adgate Congdon, and his wife, Clara Hesperia Bannister Congdon on April 22, 1894 in Duluth, Saint Louis County, Minnesota, USA. In 1905, Chester began building Glensheen Historic Estate, a 39-room mansion on their  estate in Duluth, Minnesota, seeing it finished 3 years later. Chester died in 1916, and Clara many years later in 1950, upon which Elisabeth inherited Glensheen.

In 1932, Elisabeth, a single woman in her late thirties, adopted a daughter, Jacqueline Barnes and renamed her Marjorie Mannering Congdon. A second daughter, Jennifer Susan Congdon, was adopted in 1935. Marjorie was the "black sheep" of the family, as she constantly borrowed money from her mother and married numerous times. Early in her life Marjorie was diagnosed a sociopath, was put into institutions and for a time appeared to be improving. Marjorie had seven children by her first husband, Dick LeRoy, and she spoiled them with luxuries, the majority of which were furnished by Elisabeth.  She was divorced after twenty years of marriage.  Marjorie's second marriage was to a man named Roger Sipe Caldwell. She and Caldwell kept asking Elisabeth for money, reportedly so they could realize their dream of a horse ranch.

On June 27, 1977 at 3:00am, Elisabeth Congdon and her nurse Velma Pietila (born April 26, 1911) were found murdered. Elisabeth was found suffocated with a satin pillow in her bed and Velma, who was lying on a window seat, had been beaten to death with a candlestick. The motive was initially unclear because few valuables were looted from the room.

The murder happened in Elisabeth's older sister Helen's bedroom. Some think it happened in Elisabeth's room, which was furnished with expensive articles of furniture from France. After her elder sister moved out of the mansion, Elisabeth took over her room as it was bigger.  This room is recognizable by the gray color scheme and the pink tile around the fireplace.

Elisabeth's daughter Marjorie was to receive $8 million at the time of her mother's death. Three days before Elisabeth's death, Marjorie had authorized a paper saying Roger was to receive about $2.5 million of her share. Based on evidence found at the scene and later in Roger and Marjorie's possession, they were arrested. Roger Caldwell was tried first and convicted in 1978. Marjorie was acquitted in 1979.  The Minnesota Supreme Court overturned Caldwell's conviction in 1983.  Rather than risk an acquittal at retrial, the prosecution offered him a plea deal, a confession, guilty plea to second-degree murder and time served (he had served five years of a twenty-year sentence). He confessed to both murders on July 5, 1983 and was released. He committed suicide on May 18, 1988. In his suicide note he claimed he was innocent of killing Elisabeth Congdon. He never got any of the promised money from Marjorie.

Years later, Marjorie was convicted of insurance fraud and arson and was sent to Perryville prison in Arizona on July 19, 1993. Though she was suspected in the death of her third (bigamous) husband, Wally Hagen, Arizona authorities have never brought charges against her for that crime. Children of her third husband's first marriage suspect that she was involved in the unexpected death of Mr. Hagen's first wife.  Marjorie was released from Arizona State Prison on January 5, 2004. She was arrested again, on March 23, 2007, in Tucson, Arizona, at her residence at an assisted living facility on charges of computer fraud and several other counts.

In November 2008, Marjorie Congdon LeRoy Caldwell Hagen pleaded guilty to fraud after illegally taking funds from the bank account of Roger Sammis after his death.  Mr. Sammis had been under her care before his death, and some suspect Ms. Congdon of foul play. In November 2010 a judge in southern Arizona refused a probation relief.

Elisabeth's daughter Jennifer C. Johnson died on May 15, 2017 in Chandler, AZ.

In popular culture
In 2015, a musical titled Glensheen based on the murders was created by Jeffrey Hatcher and Chan Poling.

Sources
Sharon D. Hendry, Glensheen's Daughter, The Marjorie Congdon Story, 1998 (10th. ed.: 2009).
Gail Feichtinger with John DeSanto & Gary Waller, Will to Murder: The True Story Behind the Crimes & Trials Surrounding the Glensheen Killings, 2003 (4th. ed. June 2009).
CourtTV, February 2005, Power, Privilege, and Justice, hosted by Dominick Dunne.
Tuesday, June 28, 1977: The Congdon murders, June 27, 2008 StarTribune article.
November 19, 2008 Tucson Citizen article.
Supreme Court of Minnesota 08/07/81 Matter Elisabeth M. Congdon v. 51721 (about the fate of the heritage)
State of Minnesota vs. Robin Caldwell (High School Mock Trial, Minnesota State Bar Association, Cases 2010-2011. Based on actual data and documents. Case dedicated to the memory of Elisabeth Mannering Congdon and Velma Pietila.

References

1894 births
1977 deaths
June 1977 events in the United States
American murder victims
People from Duluth, Minnesota
People murdered in Minnesota
1977 in Minnesota
1977 murders in the United States